Raymond Hamilton Fulton (born 24 September 1953) is an English former professional footballer who played in the Football League as a left back.

References

1953 births
Living people
Footballers from Hendon
English footballers
Association football defenders
Leyton Orient F.C. players
Wealdstone F.C. players
Folkestone F.C. players
English Football League players